The 1958 Michigan State Spartans football team represented Michigan State University in the 1958 Big Ten Conference football season. In their fifth season under head coach Duffy Daugherty, the Spartans compiled a 3–5–1 overall record (0–5–1 against Big Ten opponents) and finished in last place in the Big Ten Conference.

Two Spartans were selected as first-team players on the 1958 All-Big Ten Conference football team: end Sam Williams (AP-2, UPI-1) and guard Ellison Kelly (UPI-1). Halfback Dean Look was selected for the second team. Williams was also selected as a consensus first-team player on the 1958 College Football All-America Team.

The 1958 Spartans lost the annual Indiana–Michigan State football rivalry game by a 6 to 0 score and played to a 12 to 12 tie in the annual Michigan–Michigan State football rivalry game. In non-conference play, the Spartans won all three games, defeating California (32–12), Pittsburgh (22–8), and Kansas State (26–7).

Schedule

References

Michigan State
Michigan State Spartans football seasons
Michigan State Spartans football